The canton of Marignane is an administrative division of the Bouches-du-Rhône department, in southeastern France. At the French canton reorganisation which came into effect in March 2015, it was expanded from 2 to 7 communes. Its seat is in Marignane.

It consists of the following communes: 
Carry-le-Rouet 
Châteauneuf-les-Martigues
Ensuès-la-Redonne
Gignac-la-Nerthe
Marignane
Le Rove
Sausset-les-Pins

References

Cantons of Bouches-du-Rhône